Maksim Vladimirovich Budnikov (born 31 May 1983) is a Russian former professional footballer.

Club career
He made his debut in the Russian Premier League in 2007 for FC Krylia Sovetov Samara.

References

1983 births
Living people
People from Mordovia
Russian footballers
PFC Krylia Sovetov Samara players
Russian Premier League players
FC Mordovia Saransk players
Association football defenders
FC Neftekhimik Nizhnekamsk players
FC Nosta Novotroitsk players
Sportspeople from Mordovia